Amantis philippina is a species of praying mantis native to the Philippines.

See also
List of mantis genera and species

References

philippina
Mantodea of Southeast Asia
Insects of the Philippines
Insects described in 1915